Andrea Moroni (born 10 October 1985) is a Sammarinese footballer who currently plays for ASD Verucchio Calcio.

He has been capped by the San Marino national football team, making his international debut in 2011.

References

1985 births
Living people
Sammarinese footballers
San Marino international footballers
Association football forwards
S.C. Faetano players
A.S. San Giovanni players
Campionato Sammarinese di Calcio players